Lee David Cowling (born 22 September 1977, in Doncaster, England) is an English former professional footballer who played in the Football League as a defender for Nottingham Forest and Mansfield Town.

Playing career
Born in Doncaster, Cowling started his career as a trainee at Manchester United, after they spotted him playing junior league football in Doncaster for Bessacarr Green, beating Sheffield Wednesday to his signature. After a backroom shuffle, Lee left and joined Nottingham Forest. Lee was considered a highly rated prospect, playing for Nottingham Forest under Brian Clough, Frank Clark, Stuart Pearce, and Ron Atkinson. He was a regular in their youth team as well as the England schoolboy setup alongside players such as Paul Scholes, Phil and Gary Neville and David Beckham. He also represented England in the Under-18 squad alongside Rio Ferdinand, Michael Carrick, Frank Lampard and Emile Heskey.

After a brief stint at Mansfield Town, the club at which his father Dave Cowling started his career, a reoccurring knee injury forced him to retire in his early twenties. He later signed for non-league Kettering in 2000, where he made 63 appearances in two seasons with the club.

Coaching career
Lee is a UEFA A qualified coach who also holds The FA Youth Coaches Award and the Futsal Coaching qualification.

Lee worked as an Academy coach at Middlesbrough FC, and helped to develop two leading College football development centres, winning championships and cups consistently. He is responsible for helping a large number of college football players to move back into the professional game.

In 2011, Lee along with his father founded the Esprit Football Academy based at Doncaster Rovers Keepmoat training facilities, and High Melton College, providing formal education and footballing education to teenagers and young adults.

In September 2015, Lee joined Doncaster Rovers as an academy coach, and as of 2019, he also works in association with Fulham FC delivering a youth development scheme which as seen Fulham expand into countries such as Spain, South Africa, the United States, and Japan. with his company ProcampsUK.

Private life
His father is ex-football player Dave Cowling

References

External links

Living people
Footballers from Doncaster
English footballers
Nottingham Forest F.C. players
Burton Albion F.C. players
Mansfield Town F.C. players
Kettering Town F.C. players
King's Lynn F.C. players
1977 births
Association football fullbacks